Christopher Alvengrip, né Nilsson (born 12 March 1990) is a Swedish footballer who plays as a midfielder. He played in the Allsvenskan for Mjällby AIF.

References

External links

1990 births
Living people
Association football midfielders
Mjällby AIF players
Swedish footballers